Chang Ching-hui (19 June 1942 – 19 August 2022) was a Taiwanese politician. She served one term in the Legislative Yuan, from 2005 to 2008.

Early life and education
Chang was of Hakka descent. She earned a master's degree from Tamkang University and was a teacher.

She married political activist  in 1977. He had been imprisoned in the 1960s due to his association with Peng Ming-min and Roger Hsieh. He was jailed again after the Kaohsiung Incident in 1979. Released in May 1987, Wei died in December 1999 of a heart attack. Wei and Chang's daughter  is also a politician.

Political career
Chang represented the Democratic Progressive Party in the 2004 elections and won a seat in the Legislative Yuan via proportional representation. Near the end of her term, Chang served on the Home and Nations Committee. She advocated for the legislature to pass a bill similar to Jessica's Law in March 2007, and stated in June that Chinese spouses of Taiwanese nationals should continue to be granted citizenship after eight years of residency, not four, considering the state of national security, Cross-Strait relations, and population density.

Death 
Chang died on 19 August 2022, at the age of 80.

References

1942 births
2022 deaths
21st-century Taiwanese women politicians
Taiwanese politicians of Hakka descent
Members of the 6th Legislative Yuan
Party List Members of the Legislative Yuan
Democratic Progressive Party Members of the Legislative Yuan
Tamkang University alumni
Taiwanese schoolteachers